Our Lady of the Don is a 14th-century Eleusa icon representing the Virgin Mary with the infant Jesus Christ. The icon, currently held in Tretyakov Gallery, in Moscow, displays an Eleusa composition. The origins of the icon and the exact date of its creation are debated. It is believed that it was painted by Theophanes the Greek c. 1382–1395. The monastery book of Donskoy Monastery states that Our Lady of the Don was a gift from the Don Cossacks to Dmitry Donskoy the day before Battle of Kulikovo (1380).

See also
 Eleusa icon

References

External links
 
 Our Lady of the Don at the Pravoslavie.ru (in Russian).
Byzantium: faith and power (1261-1557), an exhibition catalog from The Metropolitan Museum of Art (fully available online as PDF), which contains material on Our Lady of the Don (88)

1380s paintings
1390s paintings
Icons of the Tretyakov Gallery
Don
14th-century Christianity
Paintings of the Madonna and Child